The Weld River is a river in the South West region of Western Australia.

The river rises below Mount Burnside in the Lake Muir State forest. The river flows in a southerly direction through the Shannon National Park until it flows into the Deep River, of which it is a tributary.

The water quality of the river is excellent and is considered fresh.

References 

Rivers of the South West region